Dagfa School Nottingham was an independent, co-educational school in Beeston, Nottinghamshire, England, which included Dagfa Nursery, Dagfa Junior School and Dagfa Senior School.

Facilities
The Dagfa school opened in 1948 in a converted 18th-century family home, a listed building. In 1969, it became the Dagfa House School, a fully independent day school.  In 2010, it became the Dagfa School Nottingham.

By July 2016, Dagfa School Nottingham comprised Woodlands (a second large house), a multi-purpose gym hall, a library as well as a third building housing sciences, Information and communications technology, and a modern studio theatre. Girls and boys between ages 2 and 16 were taught.

Closure
On 27 May 2016, the school announced to staff and parents that it would close at the end of the summer term. On 15 July 2016, Dagfa School Nottingham closed, apart from the nursery, which closed in August. The school trustees put the school into administration on 20 July 2016.

References

External links
 Independent Schools Inspectorate Report, 2012
 School website No longer available

Defunct schools in Nottinghamshire
Beeston, Nottinghamshire
Educational institutions disestablished in 2016
2016 disestablishments in England